Chromis is a genus of fish in the family Pomacentridae.  While the term damselfish describes a group of marine fish including more than one genus, most damselfish are in the genus Chromis. These fish are popular aquarium pets due to their small size, tolerance for poor water quality, and bright colors, though their lifespans tend to be shorter than other fish.

Species

 
These are the currently recognized species in this genus:

References

 
Chrominae
Pomacentridae
Extant Miocene first appearances
Marine fish genera
Taxa named by Georges Cuvier